Sireh-ye Olya (also Romanized as Sīreh-ye ‘Olyā; also known as Lāsūreh-ye ‘Olyā and Sīreh-ye Bālā) is a village in Heshmatabad Rural District, in the Central District of Dorud County, Lorestan Province, Iran. At the 2006 census, its population was 25, in 5 families.

References 

Towns and villages in Dorud County